Topi West is an administrative unit, known as Union council of Swabi District in the Khyber Pakhtunkhwa province of Pakistan.

District Swabi has four Tehsils i.e. Swabi Tehsil, Lahor, Topi Tehsil and Razar. There are 56 union councils in the Swabi district divided between these four Tehsils.

See also 

Swabi District

External links
Khyber-Pakhtunkhwa Government website section on Lower Dir
United Nations
 HAJJ website Uploads
PBS paiman.jsi.com

Swabi District
Populated places in Swabi District
Union councils of Khyber Pakhtunkhwa
Union Councils of Swabi District